The Gig Is Up is a Canadian documentary film, directed by Shannon Walsh and released in 2021. The film explores the impact of the contemporary gig economy on society.

The film premiered on April 23, 2021, at the Copenhagen International Documentary Film Festival, and had its Canadian premiere at the Hot Docs Canadian International Documentary Festival on April 29.

Sophie Farkas Bolla received a Canadian Screen Award nomination for Best Editing in a Documentary at the 10th Canadian Screen Awards in 2022.

Reception

Critical response
The Gig is Up received positive reviews from film critics. On Rotten Tomatoes, it has a 100% approval rating based on reviews from 11 critics.

References

External links

The Gig Is Up at Library and Archives Canada

2021 films
2021 documentary films
Canadian documentary films
2020s English-language films
2020s Canadian films